Brun is a masculine given name which may refer to:

 Brun or Bruno of Querfurt (c. 974–1009), Christian missionary bishop and martyr
 Brun I, Count of Brunswick (c. 975–c. 1010)
 Brun or Bruno, Duke of Saxony (died 880)
 Brun Smith (1922–1997), New Zealand cricketer

Masculine given names